The Nightingale (Russian: Соловей, Solovey) is a short opera in three acts by Igor Stravinsky to a Russian-language libretto by him and Stepan Mitusov, based on a tale by Hans Christian Andersen: nasty Chinese Emperor is reduced to tears and made kind by small grey bird. It was completed on 28 March 1914 and premiered a few weeks later, on 26 May, by the Ballets Russes conducted by Pierre Monteux at the Palais Garnier in Paris. Publication, by the then Paris-based Éditions Russes de Musique, followed only in 1923 and caused the opera to become known by its French title of Le Rossignol and French descriptor of conte lyrique, or lyric tale, despite its being wholly Russian.

Symphonic poem
In 1917 Stravinsky created a separate concert work, a symphonic poem, from music from the opera. Published in 1921, this is correctly titled in French, unlike the opera: Chant du Rossignol  [sic] (Song of the Nightingale).

Composition
Stravinsky began work on the opera in 1908 but put it aside after receiving the next year the commission from Sergei Diaghilev for the ballet The Firebird. He returned to it in 1913 after he had completed three ballets for Diaghilev, Petrushka and The Rite of Spring being the others. Act I, set at the seashore, was mostly complete by 1909; Acts II and III, set at court, were finished in early 1914. Stravinsky was no doubt aware of the advances in his style and technique during the intervening years.

Change in output
After The Nightingale Stravinsky turned aside from large productions to concentrate on chamber music and piano music.

Performance history
For the opera's premiere, the singers were in the pit while their roles were mimed and danced on stage; the mise-en-scène was by Alexandre Benois, who also designed the sets and costumes, and Alexandre Sanine; Boris Romanov was the choreographer. The American premiere took place on 6 March 1926, but in French, at the Metropolitan Opera; this company would perform The Nightingale in its original language for the first time on 3 December 1981. 

The Santa Fe Opera in New Mexico presented many operas by Stravinsky during the decade after its founding in 1956. These included, in 1957, The Rake's Progress. Performances of The Nightingale with Stravinsky himself conducting took place in 1962 as part of the composer's 80th birthday celebrations. Other stagings took place in 1963, 1969, 1970 and 1973. In 2014 The Nightingale was paired with Mozart's The Impresario; its action took place in Paris in the 1920s. Santa Fe's cast this time included Brenda Rae, Erin Morley, Meredith Arwady and Anthony Michaels-Moore. 

In its 2009 Toronto season the Canadian Opera Company famously staged the opera together with shorter works by Stravinsky as The Nightingale and Other Short Fables. This production by Robert Lepage toured to Japan (the New National Theatre Tokyo), France (the Aix-en-Provence Festival) and the United States (the Brooklyn Academy of Music), greatly increasing the general public's awareness of a work more widely known in its symphonic poem incarnation.

Roles

Synopsis
Time: Ancient times
Place: China.  

The Fisherman acts as commentator on the story's events.

Act 1
At the seashore just before sunrise, a Fisherman hears the song of the Nightingale, which causes him to forget his troubles.  The Cook has brought officials from the court of the Emperor to hear the Nightingale, telling of the beauty of its singing. However, the Nightingale is nowhere to be heard.  The Court Chamberlain promises the Cook a position as private cook to the Emperor, if she can find the Nightingale, who finally appears, and receives an invitation from the Cook and the Chamberlain to sing for the Emperor. The Nightingale accepts the invitation, but says that its sweetest song is in the forest.

Act 2
Courtiers festoon the palace with lanterns in advance of the singing of the Nightingale.  The Cook describes the Nightingale to the courtiers noting that it is small, gray and virtually invisible, but its song causes its listeners to cry.  A procession denotes the Emperor's arrival. He commands the Nightingale to sing, and its singing touches him so deeply that he offers the bird a reward of a golden slipper to wear about its neck. Later, three Japanese emissaries offer the Emperor a mechanical nightingale, which begins to sing. The Emperor is delighted by this novelty. Taking insult at this, the genuine bird flies away, and the angered emperor orders it banished from his realm. He names the mechanical bird "first singer".

Act 3
The Emperor is ill and near death; the figure of Death appears in the Emperor's chamber. The ghosts of the Emperor's past deeds visit him while he calls for his court musicians, but the genuine Nightingale has reappeared, in defiance of the imperial edict, and has begun to sing.  Death hears the Nightingale's song and is greatly moved, and asks it to continue, which it does on condition that Death returns to the emperor his crown, sword and standard.  Death assents and gradually removes himself from the scene as the Nightingale continues to sing.  The Emperor slowly regains his strength, and on seeing the Nightingale, offers it the "first singer" post at court.  The Nightingale says that it is satisfied with the Emperor's tears as reward, and promises to sing for him each night from dusk until dawn.

Recordings

References
Notes

Sources
Taruskin, Richard, (1998),  "The Nightingale" in Stanley Sadie, (Ed.), The New Grove Dictionary of Opera, Vol. Three, pp. 604–605. London: Macmillan Publishers, Inc.   
Walsh, Stephen, "The Nightingale", in Amanda Holden (Ed.), The New Penguin Opera Guide, New York: Penguin Putnam.  pp. 906–907.  

Operas by Igor Stravinsky
Russian-language operas
Operas
1914 operas
Opera world premieres at the Paris Opera
Operas based on works by Hans Christian Andersen
Operas set in China
Music about nightingales
Works based on The Nightingale (fairy tale)